Carlos Tello Macías (born 4 November 1938) is a Mexican socialist-oriented economist, academic and diplomat. He is a former ambassador to Cuba, Portugal and Russia and a former Secretary of Budget and Planning in the cabinet of President José López Portillo. According to a document distributed in the Senate by his political rivals (including some members of his own party), he was responsible for the high inflation rate (which surpassed 100 percent) and the significant increase of the external debt (which grew from 8.6 to 92.4 billion USD) in the López Portillo administration.

Biography

Tello Macías was born in Geneva, Switzerland, where his parents, Manuel Tello Baurraud and Guadalupe Macías Viadero were serving as Mexican diplomats. He received a bachelor's degree in Business Administration from Georgetown University (1955–58), a master's degree in Economics from Columbia University (1958–59) and a doctorate's degree in the same discipline from King's College, University of Cambridge (1961–63).

He joined the Institutional Revolutionary Party (PRI) in 1976. Besides serving as Secretary of Budget and Planning in the federal cabinet (a position he was forced to resign from following a long and bitter dispute with the Secretary of Finance, Julio Rodolfo Moctezuma), Tello worked in the public sector as Undersecretary of Finance (1975–76) and as director-general of the Bank of Mexico (September 1982 – November 1982), where he substituted Miguel Mancera, who opposed his foreign exchange controls strategy.

He also worked as a guest scholar at the Woodrow Wilson International Center for Scholars at Washington, D.C. (1984) and as a visiting researcher at the Center for Mexican-United States Studies at the University of California, San Diego (1984–85).

Tello Macías is married to Catalina Díaz Casasús, a descendant of former President Porfirio Díaz.

Selected works
  (Letters from Moscow, 1994)
  (State and Economic Development: Mexico 1920-2006, 2008)

References

1938 births
Living people
Mexican diplomats
Mexican economists
Heads of Bank of Mexico
Institutional Revolutionary Party politicians
Academic staff of the National Autonomous University of Mexico
University of California, San Diego faculty
Academic staff of El Colegio de México
McDonough School of Business alumni
Columbia Graduate School of Arts and Sciences alumni
Alumni of King's College, Cambridge